Target or Flag is an album by the American jazz reedist Ken Vandermark, recorded in 1997 and released on Atavistic. It was the second recording of the Vandermark 5, which includes Mars Williams on reeds, Jeb Bishop on trombone and guitar, Kent Kessler on bass and Tim Mulvenna on drums.

Reception

In his review for AllMusic, Jason Ankeny states: "Vandermark possesses both a vast sonic range and impressive tonal strength, and backed by ace Chicago area players like Mars Williams and Kent Kessler, his most innovative ideas are executed to their fullest."

The Penguin Guide to Jazz notes that some dedications "betray his affection for the urbane precision of prime West Coast jazz, and his own pieces make the point of following some of the precepts (counterpoint, tonal contrast) which that school lived by."

The DownBeat review by Aaron Cohen states that "Vandermark knows the value of a working band, and the unit on this dics is the most cohesive that he's led... Target or Flag shows that while Vandermark's saxophone aerodynamics brought him an audience initially, it's his writing and bandleading skills that will build his lasting impact."

Target or Flag won the Cadence Magazine Readers' Poll as the best album of 1998.

Track listing
All compositions by Ken Vandermark
 "Sucker Punch" – 7:14
 "Attempted, Not Known" – 11:19
 "The Start of Something" – 8:07
 "Super Opaque" – 8:55
 "Last Call" – 7:58
 "New Luggage" – 6:31
 "8K" – 6:41
 "Fever Dream" – 8:45

Personnel
Ken Vandermark – clarinets, tenor sax
Mars Williams – saxophones
Jeb Bishop – trombone, guitar
Kent Kessler – bass
Tim Mulvenna – drums

References

1998 albums
Ken Vandermark albums
Atavistic Records albums